Rest and Be Thankful Hill Climb is a disused hillclimbing course in Glen Croe, Argyll, Scotland. The first known use of the road for a hillclimb was in 1906. The event used to count towards the British Hill Climb Championship.

Descriptions

In 1952 Motor Sport described the course: "The three danger spots on this course which is 1,425 yards long, and rises over 400 feet, are Stone Bridge, Cobblers Corner and the hairpin bend at the finish and of course there is always the occasional sheep that has to be driven off the road."

On 1 July 1961 Jackie Stewart drove a Ford 105E-engined Marcos at an event here. He said: "it's a special place for me, the cradle of my life in motor racing."

In 1970 Motor wrote:
"The Rest, the famous Scottish Rest and Be Thankful Hill climb, will be used for the last time this year. Like many long established venues, time has overtaken it from the safety angle. A lot of money needs to be spent on barriers and banks and the Royal Scottish Automobile Club who run the National Open Hill Climb there say it will cost far too much; so this year it will only be used by clubs for restricted events and then no more."

The venue has also been used for rally special stages and classic car events. The "Friends of the Rest" are working to revive the course (2009).

In September 2018 a project to establish a Scottish Motorsport Heritage Centre at the Rest and Be Thankful was granted official charitable status.

Rest and Be Thankful Hill Climb past winners

Key: R = Course Record.

See also
 Bo'ness Hill Climb
 Doune Hillclimb
 Fintray Hillclimb
 Forrestburn Hillclimb

Footnotes

External links
 Friends of the Rest: 

Hillclimbs
Motorsport in Scotland
1906 establishments in Scotland
Recurring sporting events established in 1906
Sport in Argyll and Bute
Defunct motorsport venues in Scotland
Defunct sports competitions